Ian Fletcher (born 1 December 1948) is a former professional tennis player from Australia.

Fletcher won 3 doubles titles.

Career finals

Doubles (3 wins, 3 losses)

External links
 
 

1948 births
Living people
Australian male tennis players
Tennis players from Adelaide